The Alosinae, or the shads, are a subfamily of fishes in the herring family Clupeidae. The subfamily comprises seven genera worldwide, and about 30 species.

The shads are pelagic (open water) schooling fish, of which many are anadromous or even landlocked. Several species are of commercial importance, e.g. in the genus Alosa (river herrings), Brevoortia (menhadens), and Hilsa.

See also
The Shad Foundation
Shad Planking, a Virginia political gathering featuring the consumption of American shad

References

 
Ray-finned fish subfamilies